Jamie Trachsel is an American softball coach who is the head coach of the Ole Miss Rebels softball team.

Coaching career

North Dakota State

Iowa State
On, June 9, 2016, Jamie Trachsel was announced as the head coach of the Iowa State softball program. In her only season with the Cyclones, she led them to a 5th place Big 12 finish, their best finish in the Big 12 since 1994. They completed the program's first series win over Texas. In her only season the team finished 23–35 overall and 6–12 in the Big 12.

Minnesota
On June 24, 2017, Jamie Trachsel was announced as the new head coach of the Minnesota softball program, replacing Jessica Allister who left to be the head coach of her alma mater, Stanford. In her first season at Minnesota, she led the Gophers to a 41–17 record and 17–4, 2nd place Big Ten finish, a Big Ten Tournament title, and an NCAA Tournament bid, where they eventually were eliminated in the Regionals by Washington. In her second season as head coach of the Golden Gophers in 2019, Minnesota went 46–14 and 20–2 in the Big Ten. Minnesota advanced to the NCAA Women's College World Series for the first time in program history. In her final season as Minnesota head coach, the Golden Gophers went 15–9–1 in a season shortened by the coronavirus pandemic of 2020.

Ole Miss
On April 24, 2020, Trachsel was announced as the new head coach at Ole Miss.

Head coaching record

Notes

References

1979 births
St. Cloud State University alumni
North Dakota State University alumni
Female sports coaches
American softball coaches
Living people
St. Cloud State Huskies softball players
North Dakota State Bison softball coaches
Iowa State Cyclones softball coaches
Minnesota Golden Gophers softball coaches
Ole Miss Rebels softball coaches